The 2004–05 daytime network television schedule for the five major English-language commercial broadcast networks in the United States in operation during that television season covers the weekday daytime hours from September 2004 to August 2005. The schedule is followed by a list per network of returning series, new series, and series canceled after the 2003–04 season.

Affiliates fill time periods not occupied by network programs with local or syndicated programming. PBS – which offers daytime programming through a children's program block, PBS Kids – is not included, as its member television stations have local flexibility over most of their schedules and broadcast times for network shows may vary. Also not included are stations affiliated with PAX, as its schedule is composed mainly of syndicated reruns although it also carried some first-run programs.

Legend

 New series are highlighted in bold.

Schedule
 All times correspond to U.S. Eastern and Pacific Time scheduling (except for some live sports or events). Except where affiliates slot certain programs outside their network-dictated timeslots, subtract one hour for Central, Mountain, Alaska, and Hawaii-Aleutian times.
 Local schedules may differ, as affiliates have the option to pre-empt or delay network programs. Such scheduling may be limited to preemptions caused by local or national breaking news or weather coverage (which may force stations to tape delay certain programs in overnight timeslots or defer them to a co-operated or other contracted station in their regular timeslot) and any major sports events scheduled to air in a weekday timeslot (mainly during major holidays). Stations may air shows at other times at their preference.

Monday-Friday

Saturday

Sunday

By network

ABC

Returning series:
ABC Kids
Even Stevens
Fillmore!
Kim Possible
Lilo & Stitch: The Series
Lizzie McGuire
Power Rangers Dino Thunder
The Proud Family
That's So Raven
ABC News
ABC World News Tonight with Peter Jennings
Good Morning America
This Week with George Stephanopoulos
All My Children
General Hospital
NBA Inside Stuff
One Life to Live
 The View

New series:
 ABC Kids
Phil of the Future
Power Rangers S.P.D.
W.I.T.C.H.

Not returning from 2003–04:
ABC Kids
Power Rangers Ninja Storm
Recess

CBS

Returning series:
As the World Turns
CBS News
Face the Nation
The Early Show
The Saturday Early Show
CBS Evening News with Dan Rather
CBS News Sunday Morning
The Bold and the Beautiful
Guiding Light
Nick Jr. on CBS
Blue's Clues
Dora the Explorer
Little Bill
The Price is Right
The Young and the Restless

New series:
Nick Jr. on CBS
The Backyardigans
LazyTown
Miss Spider's Sunny Patch Friends

Not returning from 2003–04:
Nickelodeon on CBS (continues on Nickelodeon)
All Grown Up!
The Brothers Garcia
ChalkZone
Hey Arnold!
The Wild Thornberrys

NBC

Returning series:
Days of Our Lives
Discovery Kids on NBC
Croc Files
Endurance
Jeff Corwin Unleashed
Kenny the Shark
Scout's Safari
Strange Days at Blake Holsey High
Trading Spaces: Boys vs. Girls
Tutenstein
NBC News
Meet the Press
NBC Nightly News with Tom Brokaw/Brian Williams
Today
Passions

New series:
Discovery Kids on NBC
Darcy's Wild Life
Time Warp Trio

Not returning from 2003–04:
Discovery Kids on NBC
Skunked TV

Fox

Returning series:
Fox Box (later renamed as 4Kids TV)
The Cramp Twins
Kirby: Right Back at Ya!
Shaman King
Sonic X
Teenage Mutant Ninja Turtles
Winx Club
Fox News Sunday
Fox Sports
The Menu
NFL Under the Helmet
This Week in Baseball

New series:
Fox Box (later renamed as 4Kids TV)
Alien Racers
F-Zero: GP Legend
Mew Mew Power
One Piece

Not returning from 2003–04:
Fox Box
Cubix
Funky Cops
Martin Mystery
Ultimate Muscle: The Kinnikuman Legacy

The WB

Returning series:
Kids WB!
Jackie Chan Adventures
MegaMan: NT Warrior
¡Mucha Lucha!
Pokémon: Advanced Challenge
Teen Titans
Xiaolin Showdown
What's New Scooby-Doo?
Yu-Gi-Oh!

New series:
Kids WB!
The Batman
Da Boom Crew
Foster's Home for Imaginary Friends

Not returning from 2003–04:
Kids WB!
Astro Boy
Codename: Kids Next Door (continues on Cartoon Network)
Ozzy & Drix
Scooby-Doo
Static Shock
X-Men: Evolution

See also
2004–05 United States network television schedule (prime-time)
2004–05 United States network television schedule (late night)

United States weekday network television schedules
2004 in American television
2005 in American television